Hitchin may refer to:

Places
 Hitchin, a town in Hertfordshire, England
 Hitchin railway station
 Hitchin (UK Parliament constituency)

People
 Derek Hitchins, a British systems engineer
 Nigel Hitchin, a British mathematician

Other
 Hitchin Town F.C., a football club
 Hitchin F.C., a defunct football club
 Hitchin functional, a mathematical concept with applications in string theory
 Hitchin system, a mathematical concept
 Hitchin Comet, a newspaper
 Hitchin' Posts, a lost 1920 drama film directed by John Ford
 Hitchin' a Ride (song):
 By Green Day
 By Vanity Fare

See also
 Hitchens
 Hitching (disambiguation)
 Hitchings, a surname